The Men's Katame No Kata event at the 2010 South American Games was held at 8:00 on March 19.

Medalists

Results

References
Report

Kata